Sekken Church (formerly: Sekken kapell) is a parish church of the Church of Norway in Molde Municipality in Møre og Romsdal county, Norway. It is located at the eastern tip of the island of Sekken which is located in the Romsdal Fjord, at the mouth of the Langfjorden. It is the church for the Sekken parish which is part of the Molde domprosti (arch-deanery) in the Diocese of Møre. The white, wooden church was built in a long church design with a Swiss chalet style in 1908 by the architects Ole Havnæs and Knut Flåthe. The church seats about 130 people.

History
The municipal council of the old Veøy Municipality voted unanimously on 4 January 1902 to petition the government for the construction of a chapel and graveyard on the island of Sekken. The people used to attend the Old Veøy Church on the neighboring island of Veøya, but in 1901, that church was closed and a new Veøy Church was built on the mainland. This left the people of Sekken island much further from their church. In 1908, a royal decree was issued authorizing the construction of the new chapel. The building was consecrated on 28 October 1908. The church bell from the Old Veøy Church was installed in the chapel's tower.

Media gallery

See also
List of churches in Møre

References

Buildings and structures in Molde
Churches in Møre og Romsdal
Long churches in Norway
Wooden churches in Norway
20th-century Church of Norway church buildings
Churches completed in 1908
1908 establishments in Norway